Class 460 may refer to:

British Rail Class 460
FS Class ETR 460